Vergilius Ture Anselm Ferm (January 6, 1896, Sioux City, Iowa – February 4, 1974, Wooster, Ohio) was the Compton Professor of Philosophy at the College of Wooster.

Selected published works
Contemporary American theology (1932)
"Theology and Religious Experience" (pp. 26–43) in The Nature of Religious Experience: Essays in Honor of Douglas Clyde Macintosh (1937)
Religion In Transition (1937)
An encyclopedia of religion (1945)
What Can We Believe? (1948)
Religion in the twentieth century  (1948)
Ancient Religions: A Symposium (1950)
A history of philosophical systems (1950)
Ancient religions (1950)
A Protestant dictionary (1951)
The Protestant credo (1953)
A dictionary of pastoral psychology (1955)
Pictorial history of Protestantism (1957)
A Brief Dictionary of American Superstitions (1959)
Classics of Protestantism (1959)
Toward an expansive Christian theology (1964)
Living schools of religion (1965)
Encyclopedia of morals (1969)
Cross-currents in the personality of Martin Luther; a study in the psychology of religious genius (1972)
Philosophy beyond the classroom (1974)
Lightning never strikes twice (if you own a feather bed): and 1904 other American superstitions from the ordinary to the eccentric (1989)

References

Further reading
 Vergilius Ferm, Memoirs of a College Professor; Telling it Like it Was, 428 pgs., Christopher Publishing House, North Quincy MA, 1971

External links
 "Dr. V. A. Ferm Publishes First Novel; Typical Small College Life Explored", from The Wooster Voice, November 19, 1954



1896 births
1974 deaths
People from Sioux City, Iowa
College of Wooster faculty
20th-century American philosophers